The Lincolnshire Commons is an upscale lifestyle center located in Lincolnshire, Illinois. The center opened in 2006 and hosts numerous high-end restaurants, and promeninent retailers such as Cheesecake Factory, Jos. A. Bank, DSW and LensCrafters. The  center is a popular shopping area in Chicago's affluent north suburbs. Regal Cinemas across the street opened November 20, 1998 as City Park 20 by Regal Entertainment. It has stadium seating and an IMAX theater. This theater is known for showing independent films.

Lincolnshire, Illinois
Brookfield Properties
Shopping malls in Lake County, Illinois
Shopping malls established in 2006